Grime (stylized as GRIME) is a 2021 Metroidvania platform-adventure game developed by Israeli game studio Clover Bite, and published by Akupara Games. The game was released on August 2, 2021 on Windows via Epic Games Store, Steam and GOG, and Google Stadia as part of Stadia Pro. Ports for the Nintendo Switch, PlayStation 4, PlayStation 5, Xbox One and Xbox Series X/S, is in development. It received generally positive reviews from critics.

Plot 
The player is set to explore a world set on perfect proportions and anatomy. During progression the player learns the history behind the world they are exploring and the reason why they are addressed by its inhabitants as "the chiseled one." The player is formed by Breath, which drains in the process of creating a form, causing many of the shapes (Heads, hands etc...) scattered in the world to be incomplete.

Development 
Clover Bite is the internal studio of Tiltan School of Design, based in Haifa, Israel. The studio collaborated to develop the game, with Akupara Games publishing the title.

The director Yarden Weissbrot, stated he wanted to create "something Israeli gamers could be proud of".

Reception 

The game received an aggregate score of 83/100 on Metacritic, indicating "generally favorable reviews".

David Wildgoose of IGN rated the game 9/10 points, calling it "an accomplished Souls-like action RPG". James Cunningham of Hardcore Gamer rated it 4/5 points, saying it was a "classic and fantastically designed Metroidvania".

References 

2021 video games
Adventure games
Akupara Games games
Dark fantasy video games
Indie video games
Metroidvania games
Nintendo Switch games
Platform games
PlayStation 4 games
PlayStation 5 games
Single-player video games
Stadia games
Video games developed in Israel
Windows games
Xbox One games
Xbox Series X and Series S games